Alton Montgomery (born June 16, 1968) is a former American football safety and kick returner  in the National Football League. He was drafted 58th in the 1990 NFL Draft by the Denver Broncos where he played for 3 years. In 1993, he was signed by the Atlanta Falcons where he played until 1996.

See also
1989 Houston Cougars football team

1968 births
Living people
People from Griffin, Georgia
American football safeties
Northwest Mississippi Rangers football players
Houston Cougars football players
Denver Broncos players
Atlanta Falcons players
Ed Block Courage Award recipients